WPRR-FM (90.1 MHz) is an FM station, licensed to Clyde Township, Michigan.

History
The station was assigned the call letters WXPZ on September 6, 2005. The call sign was changed to WPRR-FM on July 25, 2014. At the time, its programming was simulcast by WPRR, 1680 AM in Ada, Michigan, until that station changed its format in July 2020.

References

External links

PRR-FM
2005 establishments in Michigan